The Miss Perú 1979 pageant was held on June 20, 1979. That year, 22 candidates were competing for the two national crowns. The chosen winners represented Peru at the Miss Universe 1979 and Miss World 1979. The rest of the finalists would enter in different pageants.

Placements

Special Awards

 Best Regional Costume - Lambayeque - Hella Tomasini
 Miss Photogenic - Region Lima - Jacqueline Brahms 
 Miss Body - Distrito Capital – Magali Pérez-Godoy
 Best Hair - Europe Perú - Cecilia Iversen
 Miss Congeniality - Cieneguilla - Graciela Eyzaguirre
 Miss Elegance - San Isidro - Carla Peralta

.

Delegates

Amazonas - María del Carmen Perales
Áncash - María Teresa Nuñez
Arequipa - Michelle Eguren Neuenswander
Callao - Mónica Klinkemberger
Cieneguilla - Graciela Eyzaguirre
Cuzco - Myriam Del Castillo 
Distrito Capital - Magali Pérez-Godoy
Europe Perú - Cecilia Iversen
Huánuco - Eli Cuculiza Merino
Ica - Mónica Espinoza Arredondo
Junín - Lisi Krasl Murga
La Punta - Ethel Prato Arias-Schreiber
Lambayeque - Hella Tomasini 
Loreto - Carmen Vásquez Vela
Mollendo - Sonia Caballero
Piura - Danitza Ramos
Region Lima - Jacqueline Brahms
San Isidro - Carla Peralta Prentice
Tacna - Lizbeth Boluarte
Tingo María - Lyana Leiva
Trujillo - Alicia Mantilla Mayer
USA Perú - Patricia Sinclair

References 

Miss Peru
1979 in Peru
1979 beauty pageants